Golund-e Olya (also Romanized as Golūnd-e ‘Olyā; also known as Golūnd, Kolūnd, Gulūnd, and Golownd) is a village in Jolgeh-e Mazhan Rural District, Jolgeh-e Mazhan District, Khusf County, South Khorasan Province, Iran. At the 2006 census, its population was 21, in 11 families.

References 

Populated places in Khusf County